KWPA-LP (96.9 FM) was a low-power FM radio station licensed to Coupeville, Washington, USA, and serving the Central Whidbey Island area. The station was owned by the Whidbey Island Center for the Arts. Due to having been silent for more than a year, KWPA-LP's license expired on September 29, 2012, and the FCC deleted the KWPA-LP call sign from their database on February 5, 2014.

References

WPA-LP
Defunct community radio stations in the United States
WPA-LP
Defunct radio stations in the United States
Radio stations disestablished in 2014
2014 disestablishments in Washington (state)